The Piola transformation maps vectors between Eulerian and Lagrangian coordinates in continuum mechanics. It is named after Gabrio Piola.

Definition 
Let  with  an affine transformation. Let   with   a domain with Lipschitz boundary. The mapping

is called Piola transformation. The usual definition takes the absolute value of the determinant, although some authors make it just the determinant.

Note: for a more general definition in the context of tensors and elasticity, as well as a proof of the property that the Piola transform conserves the flux of tensor fields across boundaries, see Ciarlet's book.

See also 

 Piola–Kirchhoff stress tensor
Raviart–Thomas basis functions
 Raviart–Thomas Element

References

Continuum mechanics